Walking the Trail: One Man's Journey along the Cherokee Trail of Tears is the 1991 book by Jerry Ellis telling the story of his 900-mile walk along the Cherokee Trail of Tears, the same walk his ancestors were forced to take in 1838.  Walking the Trail has been used in classrooms and as a teaching resource by award-winning educators, including James Percoco who is in the National Teachers Hall of Fame.

Reception
The work was well received, with the Los Angeles Times stating that  "Jerry Ellis is an ideal companion for a long ramble along the back roads of America, which is precisely what he provides in Walking the Trail, a picaresque account of his trek over the Trail of Tears in commemoration of his Cherokee ancestors and in search of some elusive ideal of freedom and fulfillment."

References

1991 non-fiction books
American memoirs